Minuscule 419 (in the Gregory-Aland numbering), ε 232 (in the Soden numbering), is a Greek minuscule manuscript of the New Testament, on parchment. Palaeographically it has been assigned to the 12th century. 
The manuscript has complex contents. It has marginalia.

Description 

The codex contains the text of the four Gospels on 262 parchment leaves with some lacunae. The text is written in one column per page, in 22 lines per page.

There is also a division according to the Ammonian Sections (no references to the Eusebian Canons).

The texts of John 8:44-11:33; 21:7-25 is written on paper and was added in the 16th century.

Text 

The Greek text of the codex is a representative of the Byzantine text-type. Aland placed it in Category V.
According to the Claremont Profile Method it represents textual family Kx in Luke 1, Luke 10, and Luke 20. It creates a textual pair with 272.

History 

Formerly the manuscript was housed at the monastery of St. Michael de Muriano in Venice. The manuscript was described by Mittarelli (1708-1777), along with the codex 595. It was added to the list of New Testament manuscripts by Scholz (1794-1852).
C. R. Gregory saw it in 1886.

The manuscript is currently housed at the Biblioteca Marciana (Gr. I. 60) in Venice.

See also 

 List of New Testament minuscules
 Biblical manuscript
 Textual criticism

References

Further reading 

 J. B. Mitarelli, Bibliotheca codicum manuscriptorum monasterii S. Michaelis, Venedig 1779.

Greek New Testament minuscules
12th-century biblical manuscripts